Sveningen is a mountain in Vestland county, Norway. It is the second highest mountain in Bergen municipality, after Gullfjellet.

See also
List of mountains of Norway

References

Mountains of Vestland
Bjørnafjorden
Mountains of Bergen
Samnanger